"Tell Me" is a song by Melanie B, released as the lead single from her debut solo album Hot on 25 September 2000. The song debuted at its peak position of number four on the UK Singles Chart and reached number one on the UK Hip-Hop Chart. Co-written by Fred Jerkins III, LaShawn Daniels, and Brown herself, the song is about her former husband Jimmy Gulzar.

Music video
The music video for "Tell Me" was directed by Nigel Dick and shot on 10 and 11 July 2000. It starts with Brown putting a disc into a CD player. As the music starts she walks down an alley where a crowd gathers and they all perform a synchronized dance as the chorus starts. As the video progresses, it shows Melanie in many different settings, and as the song starts to fade she is seen sitting where the first dance took place staring off-camera.

Track listings and formats
These are the formats and track listings of major single releases of "Tell Me".

 UK CD
 "Tell Me"  - 3:55
 "Tell Me"  - 4:20
 "Tell Me"  - 4:05
 "Tell Me" 

 UK CD2
 "Tell Me"  - 4:33
 "Tell Me"  - 4:05
 "Tell Me"  - 5:42

Charts

References

2000 songs
2000 singles
Mel B songs
Songs written by LaShawn Daniels
Songs written by Fred Jerkins III
Songs written by Mel B
Music videos directed by Nigel Dick